"Life Is a Minestrone" is a 1975 song by 10cc released as a lead single from their third album, The Original Soundtrack.

Background
The track was written after Lol Creme and Eric Stewart were driving home from Strawberry Studios and a BBC Radio presenter said something that they only partly heard, but which Creme interpreted as "life is a minestrone". Stewart and Creme believed the phrase to be a good title for a song on the grounds that life is, according to Stewart in a BBC Radio Wales interview, "a mixture of everything we pile in there". They had the song written in a day.

Personnel
Adapted from the liner notes of The Original Soundtrack.
 Lol Creme – vocals, piano, percussion, electric guitar
 Kevin Godley – drums, timbales, percussion, backing vocals
 Eric Stewart – electric guitar, backing vocals
 Graham Gouldman – bass, guitars, backing vocals

Release
The song was released as the lead single from The Original Soundtrack as the band had reservations regarding the 6:00+ ballad "I'm Not in Love" being the lead single. In the United States, "Life Is a Minestrone" was not released until after the release of "I'm Not in Love", so the band re-released the record over there in 1976 with "Lazy Ways" from the next album, How Dare You!, as its B-side.

The B-side "Channel Swimmer" appears as a bonus track on the later CD release of The Original Soundtrack.

Reception

Commercial
The song charted at no. 7 on the UK Singles Chart, no. 12 on the Netherlands Singles Chart, and no. 7 on the Irish Singles Chart in 1975; in 1976, it charted at no. 104 on the Billboard Hot 100.

Critical
In his review for AllMusic, Dave Thompson calls the song "utterly daft, wholly compulsive", and a "deadly accurate barrage of disconnected theories, thoughts and ghastly geographical puns, all tied together by that bizarre nomenclatural observation and a fadeout which is pure Paul McCartney". He notes that "reducing the human condition to the contents of a well-stacked pantry, composers Lol Creme and Eric Stewart combine for a truly joyous slice of pop nonsense, and one of 10cc's most effervescent hit singles".

References

1975 singles
1975 songs
Songs written by Eric Stewart
Songs written by Lol Creme
10cc songs